The International Confederation of Arab Trade Unions (ICATU; ar:"الاتحاد الدولي لنقابات العمال العربي") is the international representation of trade unions in a number of Arab nations.

Founded in 1956, the ICATU was originally located in Egypt, but was moved to Syria in 1978 to protest Anwar Sadat's visit to Israel.

Affiliate trade unions include the following:
General Federation of Trade Unions (Syria)
 General Federation of Oman Workers
 General Federation of Workers Trade Unions in Bahrain
 General Federation of Iraqi Trade Unions
 General Federation of Jordanian Trade Unions
 Palestinian General Federation of Trade Unions
 Democratic Workers' Union of Egypt
 Tunisian General Labour Union
 General and Autonomous Confederation Workers in Algeria (CGATA)
 Moroccan Federation of Labour
 The Democratic Confederation of Labour (CDT)
 General Federation of Women in Morocco
 Union of Mauritanian Workers
 Free Confederacy of Mauritania's Workers
 Yemeni Confederation of Labor Unions

References

 
Economy of the Arab League
Arab League